Alicia Monson (born May 13, 1998) is an American long distance runner who primarily competes in the 5000 meters and 10,000 meters. She is the North American record holder for the 10,000 m and the North American indoor record holder for the 3000 meters.

Career
Monson grew up in Amery, Wisconsin. While competing for the University of Wisconsin, she earned Big Ten titles, All-American titles and a 2019 5000 m indoor NCAA title. Monson runs for On Athletics Club in Boulder, Colorado.

On June 26, 2021 at the U.S. Olympic Track & Field Trials held in Eugene, Oregon, she came third in the 10,000 m race in a time of 31:18.55 to claim the same spot on the American team for the event at the delayed 2020 Tokyo Olympics. Such was the effort, after the medal ceremony, she collapsed and started vomiting and had to go to the hospital as a precaution, according to her coach, Dathan Ritzenhein. She finished 13th at the Games in 31:21.36.

In January 2022, Monson won the USATF Cross Country Championships held in San Diego, California. She next placed seventh over the 3000 m at the World Indoor Championships in Belgrade in March, and 13th in the 10,000 m at the World Championships held in Eugene, Oregon in July. That year she set personal bests in the 3000 m (out and indoors), 5000 m (~11-second improvement) and 10,000 m (~27-second improvement), and capped her season in December with a win at the Cross Champs in Austin, Texas, the gold meet of the World Cross Country Tour.

On February 11, 2023, she set a new North American indoor record in the 3000 meters with a time of 8:25.05 at the Millrose Games in New York, improving her lifetime best by more than six seconds. She broke by 0.65 s Karissa Schweizer’s record set in 2020. On March 4, Monson smashed Molly Huddle's North American 10,000 m record of 30:13.17 set in 2016 with a time of 30:03.82 at the Sound Running The TEN in San Juan Capistrano.

Achievements

Personal bests
 1500 meters – 4:07.09 (Portland, OR 2021)
 1500 meters indoor – 4:06.38 (New York, NY 2023)
 3000 meters – 8:26.81 (Lausanne 2022)
 3000 meters indoor – 8:25.05 (New York, NY 2023) North American record
 5000 meters – 14:31.11 (Oslo 2022)
 5000 meters indoor – 15:31.26 (Birmingham 2019)
 10,000 meters – 30:03.82 (San Juan Capistrano, CA 2023) North American record
Road
 5 kilometres – 14:38 (Zürich 2022)

NCAA titles
 NCAA Division I Women's Indoor Track and Field Championships
 5000 meters: 2019

References

External links
 
 
 Wisconsin Badgers bio

1998 births
Living people
American female long-distance runners
Track and field athletes from Wisconsin
People from Amery, Wisconsin
Wisconsin Badgers women's track and field athletes
Athletes (track and field) at the 2020 Summer Olympics
Olympic track and field athletes of the United States
21st-century American women
20th-century American women